European Home Systems (EHS) Protocol was a communication protocol aimed at home appliances control and communication using power line communication (PLC), developed by the European Home Systems Association (EHSA).

After merging with two other protocols, it is a part of the KNX standard, which complies with the European Committee for Electrotechnical Standardization (CENELEC) norm EN 50090 and has a chance to be a basis for the first open standard for home and building control.

See also 
 Building automation
 Home automation

External links 
 Home Automation with EHS: Cheap But Slow - Nikkei Electronics Asia
 www.cenelec.eu  - European Committee for Electrotechnical Standardization
 www.konnex.org - association aimed at development of home and building control systems.

Home automation
Network protocols